A list of films produced in France in 2011.

Notes

External links
 2011 in France
 2011 in French television
 French films of 2011 at the Internet Movie Database
French films of 2011 at Cinema-francais.fr
 List of 2011 box office number-one films in France

2011
Films
French